Ani is an American Billboard top 40 recording artist and songwriter. Her first single, "Dance The Night Away", debuted on the Billboard Dance Club Songs chart at #50 on July 7, 2018, and reached its peak at #33 on July 28, 2018. It spent a total of seven weeks on the chart.  "Dance The Night Away," written by Ani, Robert Eibach and David Longoria featured remixes by producer Robert Eibach, ChudaBeats, HuDanz, DJ Chris Z and hi5. Her second single "Confession" peaked on the Billboard Club Songs chart on September 28, 2019. She is currently working on her debut album in Los Angeles, California.

Early life 
Ani was born on June 8, 1999, in Guatemala and raised in Maui, Hawaii before moving to Los Angeles to pursue music.

Discography 
Singles
 "Dance The Night Away" (2018)
"Confession" (2019)

Reception 
Dance The Night Away debuted on the Billboard Dance Club Songs chart at #50 on July 7, 2018 and reached its peak #33 on July 28, 2018.  As of September 1, 2018, it was #28 on the Starfleet Music Dance Songs chart. Ani's second single "Confession" was released in the summer of 2019 and debuted at #40 on the Billboard Dance Club Songs chart and peaked at #14 on September 28 where it stayed for two weeks.  This is her highest Billboard charting song to date.

References

1999 births
Living people
Place of birth missing (living people)
21st-century American musicians
American dance musicians
American women songwriters
21st-century American women musicians